This page lists the albums that reached number one on the Top R&B/Hip-Hop Albums and Top Rap Albums charts in 2006. The Rap Albums chart partially serves as a distillation of rap-specific titles from the overall R&B/Hip-Hop Albums chart.

Chart history

See also
2006 in music
2006 in hip hop music
List of number-one R&B singles of 2006 (U.S.)
List of Billboard 200 number-one albums of 2006

References 

2006
2006
United States RandB Hip Hop Albums